CID Kolkata Bureau is a Bengali crime detective television series in which Sudip Mukherjee plays the central role as the Senior ACP and the chief of the CID team who pursue criminals through detailed investigation. It is broadcast Monday and Tuesday evenings on Sony Aath. Launched in November 2012, it is a spin-off of the Hindi TV series C.I.D.

Cast 
 Sudip Mukherjee as Senior ACP Ekalavya
 Kaushik Chakraborty as ACP Bir Singha
 Joy Bhattacharya as Senior Inspector Ronojoy
 Biplab Banerjee as Dr. Arrow
 Tribikram Ghosh as Sub-Inspector Tej 
 Partha Pratim Dutta as Sub-Inspector Satyaki 
 Aatish Bhattacharya as Inspector Indrajit 
 Sanjukta Das as Sub-Inspector Damini 
 Debashree Chakraborty as Inspector Gargi 
 Paulami Banerjee as Inspector Jaggyaseni

Episode list 
 ep1 Apaharan Rahasyo
 ep2 Bhuture Hotp
 ep3 Blackmail
 ep4 Saharey Santrash
 ep5 Gaye Holud
 ep6 Tatoo
 ep7 Phobia
 ep8 Maron Phhand
 ep9 Protishodh
 ep10 Narokhadak
 ep11 Bishakto Gahona
 ep12 Maron Rashi
 ep13 Joda Khuner Rahasyo
 ep14 Serial Killer
 ep15 Premdando
 ep16 Maatrireen
 ep17 Chor Bazaar
 ep18 Drug E Nesha
 ep19 Aakrosh
 ep20 Hanabari
 ep21 Parinayer Parinam
 ep22 Adbhuture
 ep23 Jiban Naye Khela
 ep24 Khelar Naam Mrityu
 ep25 Samayer Bichar
 ep26 Parokiya
 ep27 Bishphorak
 ep28 Artho Anartho
 ep29 Pyanchar Pyanche
 ep30 Jighangsa
 ep31 Agyaato Atoayee
 ep32 Rashichakro
 ep33 Samayer Chakrobuho
 ep34 Ghatak Bullet
 ep35 Guptodhaner Sondhane
 ep36 Prem Aahuti
 ep37 Naam Mrityu
 ep38 Chhadmabeshi
 ep39 Abir
 ep40 Mrityur Pheriwala
 ep41 Mrityu Magic
 ep42 Maron Prem
 ep43 Bandini
 ep44 Prem Aagun
 ep45 Gurudakshina
 ep46 Aaghat
 ep47 Sahosi Sei Meye
 ep48 Bandho Dorjar Opare
 ep49 Nikhonj
 ep50 Chakrabuhye Arjun
 ep51 Maron Khelay
 ep52 Adbhut Atotayee
 ep53 Virus Juddho
 ep54 Mrityur Haatchhani
 ep55 Protarak
 ep56 Swarnodando
 ep57 Antorale
 ep58 Mrityubandhan
 ep59 Ranajoyee
 ep60 Nayikar Khonje
 ep61 Highway Ebong
 ep62 Achena Tara
 ep63 Chirkut
 ep64 Aadim Ripu
 ep65 Chhayamanobi
 ep66 Nodir Kinara Ghenshe
 ep67 Indraboloy
 ep68 Adrishyo Trikon
 ep69 Doshi Ke
 ep70 Shudhu Bish
 ep71 Kencho Khuntre Keute
 ep72 Mrityubishada
 ep73 Bohuroopi
 ep74 Bhootrango
 ep75 Deya Neya
 ep76 Premroshe
 ep77 Ekdin Raate
 ep78 Shab Shaishab
 ep79 Prem Na Protishodh?
 ep80 Rakhibandhan
 ep81 Bhootbanglo
 ep82 Mrityu Na Hatya
 ep83 Mrityudoot
 ep84 Aro Ekjon
 ep85 Subho Janmodeen
 ep86 Alor Dishari
 ep87 Kankal Rahasyo
 ep88 Mitro Sanhar
 ep89 Khela Bhangar
 ep90 Agyaatobase Ekalabyo
 ep91 Khiladi Ebar CID
 ep92 Bishkahini
 ep93 Gharer Shatru Bibheeshan
 ep94 Asamapto Adhyay
 ep95 Mrityumichhil
 ep96 Lukochuri
 ep97 Sesh Sakkhatkar
 ep98 Phire Dekha
 ep99
 ep100 Aarale Ke?
 ep101 Abhishapto Prasad
 ep102 Ratnogarbha
 ep103 Ek Lekhika Mrityu Ebong
 ep104 
 ep105 Khunjey Phiri
 ep106 Rakter Akkhorey
 ep107 Mrityur Gahwarey
 ep108 Damini
 ep109 Murtir Antrorale
 ep110
 ep111
 ep112
 ep114
 ep115
 ep116
 ep117
 ep118 Bishakto Phhand
 ep119 Kirti Dampatir
 ep120 Bipader Gheratope
 ep121 Bipadseema Perie
 ep122 Mon Ku Ashay
 ep123 Andho Anuragi
 ep124 Mrityur Rasayan
 ep125 Khela Bhanglo Jakhon
 ep126 Cholakola
 ep127 Mrityukhela
 ep128 Roop Badole
 ep129 Bhul Anko
 ep130 Badla
 ep131 Sajano Saja
 ep132 Abhishapto Choukath
 ep133 Antortadanto
 ep134 Atotayee
 ep135 Mrityur Aloy

References 

Indian crime television series
2012 Indian television series debuts
Detective television series
Bengali-language television programming in India
2014 Indian television series endings
Indian television spin-offs
Police procedural television series
Fictional portrayals of police departments in India
Sony Aath original programming